Elitserien  is the Swedish women's volleyball top division. The regular season usually takes place from October to late February or early March and is followed up by play-offs to determine the Swedish national champion.

Teams
The following clubs are competing in the 2018–19 season:

Degerfors VBK Orion
Engelholms VS
Gislaveds VBK
Hylte/Halmstad
Lindesbergs VBK
Linköpings VC
Lunds VK
RIG Falköping
Sollentuna VK
Svedala VBK
Örebro VS

Previous winners

Source: Elitserienvolleyboll.se

Titles by team

References

External links
  Swedish League. women.volleybox.net 

Sweden
Sweden
Volleyball competitions in Sweden
Professional sports leagues in Sweden